Inland Sea may refer to:
 Inland sea (geology), a sea that covers a central area of a landmass
 specific inland seas named "Inland Sea":
 Seto Inland Sea, the body of water separating three of the main islands of Japan
 Inland Sea, a section of the Cymyran Strait between Anglesey and Holy Island, Wales
 Inland Sea, Gozo, a lagoon of seawater on the island of Gozo in Malta
 Western Inland Sea, also known as the Western Interior Seaway, a sea that split the continent of North America during the Cretaceous Period
 Khawr al Udayd, an inlet of the Persian Gulf
 Inland Sea, an album by Rin'
 Inland Sea, a book by Donald Richie
 The Inland Sea, a film based on Richie's book directed by Lucille Carra
 The Pathfinder, or The Inland Sea, an 1840 novel by James Fenimore Cooper

See also
 Closed sea
 Operation Inland Seas, a United States Navy operation in the Saint Lawrence Seaway in 1959
 Great Lakes (disambiguation)
 Caspian Sea, a body of water in central Asia classed as either an inland sea or as the world's largest lake
 Salton Sea, a shallow, saline, endorheic rift lake located directly on the San Andreas Fault, predominantly in California's Imperial and Coachella Valleys.